Ijegu is a community in Yala Local Government Area of Cross River State, Nigeria. Ijegu is made up of four (4) communities namely Ore,Ogohu,Oke and O’onyi.Ijegu seats on the coastal belt of Okpoku flowing through river niger.It is home of the Agi(s) (late Malachy Oga Agi, Sir Livinus Agi, Prof. Simon Peter Imaje Agi, Late Paul Oloko Agi FCA,S P I Agi jr, SAN Joe Agi,Barr. Emmanuel Oheta Agi etc.), late Professor Oko, Professor Edde Iji.Three (3) professors at the prestigious  University of Calabar. The people belongs to the Yala tribe and its members speak the Yala language. They are mostly farmers.

See also
Cross River State
Yala, Nigeria

External links
Cross River State of Nigeria website 
Maplandia.com - google maps world gazetteer

Populated places in Cross River State